Ahmed López (born 11 November 1984) is a Cuban cyclist. He competed in two events at the 2004 Summer Olympics.

References

External links
 

1984 births
Living people
Cuban male cyclists
Olympic cyclists of Cuba
Cyclists at the 2004 Summer Olympics
Sportspeople from Havana
Pan American Games medalists in cycling
Pan American Games gold medalists for Cuba
Cyclists at the 2003 Pan American Games
Cyclists at the 2007 Pan American Games
Medalists at the 2003 Pan American Games
Medalists at the 2007 Pan American Games
Competitors at the 2006 Central American and Caribbean Games